[[File:Xavier Dolan Césars 2017 2.jpg|thumb|Xavier Dolan with two César Awards for Best Director and Best Editing for It's Only the End of the World.]]
This is a list of awards and nominations for French Canadian filmmaker Xavier Dolan. Dolan has been awarded as a director, screenwriter, actor, editor, producer and costume designer in his films. He has received honours at the Cannes Film Festival, Canadian Screen Awards, Prix Iris and César Awards, as well as in other forums.

Canada's committee for selecting submissions for the Academy Award for Best Foreign Language Film have also chosen Dolan's films I Killed My Mother for the 82nd Academy Awards and Mommy for the 87th Academy Awards; neither was nominated. It's Only the End of the World was submitted for the 89th Academy Awards and was shortlisted.

 Cannes Film Festival 
Dolan’s films frequently premiere at the Cannes Film Festival.

César Awards
Dolan's films have been nominated for Best Foreign Film at the César Awards, France's national awards; It's Only the End of the World'' was additionally nominated in multiple categories.

Genie Awards and Canadian Screen Awards
The Genie Awards were Canada's national film awards; they were merged into the Canadian Screen Awards in 2012.

Jutra Awards and Prix Iris
Quebec's film awards were formerly known as the Jutra Awards; the Prix Iris name was announced in October 2016.

Other awards

Notes

References

External links
Xavier Dolan Awards at the Internet Movie Database

Dolan
Dolan